The 2013 Colonial Square Ladies Classic was held from November 15 to 18 at the Nutana Curling Club in Saskatoon, Saskatchewan. It was the fourth of five women's Grand Slam events of the 2013–14 World Curling Tour. The event was held in a triple knockout format with 32 teams and the purse for the event was CAD$50,000.  Winnipeg's Jennifer Jones would win the event, defeating Switzerland's Michèle Jäggi in the final. The win would be Jones' second Grand Slam win of the year.

Teams

Playoffs

References

External links

Colonial Square Ladies Classic
Colonial Square Ladies Classic
Curling in Saskatoon